Air Chief Marshal Parvaiz Mehdi Qureshi  (born 1 October 1943) best known as PQ Mehdi, is a retired four-star air officer and a former fighter pilot who served as the eighth Chief of Air Staff (CAS) of the Pakistan Air Force, appointed in 1997 until retiring in 2000.

His tenureship to command the Pakistan Air Force is notable during the events involving the short-lived military conflict with the Indian Army in Kargil in 1999. He is credited for advising against the all-out war with India to Prime Minister Nawaz Sharif, eventually providing an exit to Pakistan Army to deescalate the situation through diplomacy with India.

Biography

Parvaiz Mehdi Qureshi was born in Phalia, Punjab, into a Punjabi family on 1 October 1943. After graduating from a local high school, Mehdi joined the Pakistan Air Force in 1961, and shared a room with Pervez Musharraf and Aziz Mirza, whom he enjoyed his lifelong friendship, when he being was selected for their respected military academies.

After their interview with the local commandants, Mehdi, Musharraf, and Mirza went to see the world acclaimed Urdu movie, "Savera (lit. Dawn)". The next day, all three were called to reported back to their respected academies and were selected for their respected training in their arms of commission. Mehdi entered in the famed Pakistan Air Force Academy in Risalpur, Khyber-Pakhtunkhwa, and passed out in the class of 38th GD Pilot course where he was also conferred with the Sword of Honour by the commandant of the Air Force Academy in 1964.

After gaining commissioned in the No. 16 Squadron Black Panthers of the Pakistan Air Force (PAF) as P/Off, he qualified as the fighter pilot, flying the F-86 Sabre jet.

Between the wars and prisoner of war

In 1965, P/Off Mehdi participated in the closed air combat operations during the second war with India where he flew his F-86 Sabre against the Indian Folland Gnat. After the war,  Mehdi was promoted as F/Off in 1966; and Flight-Lieutenant in 1969.

In 1969, Flt-Lt. Mehdi was then dispatched to serve in the Dacca airbase of the Pakistan Air Force in East-Pakistan, serving in the No. 14 Squadron Tail choppers. In 1970, Mehdi took over the command of a flight of the squadron, stationed in Dacca airbase. In 1971, Mehdi actively took participation in the air operations in East Pakistan against the Indian Army and their supported insurgent group, Mukti Bahini.

On 22 November 1971, Mehdi flew a combat mission while flying his F-86 Sabre in support of operation in Garibpur against the Indian Air Force.
 
Flt. Lt. Mehdi's capture and subsequent imprisonment occurred on the same day i.e. 22 November 1971 when he was flying with the finger-four formation of the ground attack/bomber unit near the town of Garibpur, when his F-86 Sabre was shot down by a Folland Gnat piloted by Fg Off Donald Lazarus  of 22 Squadron IAF. His wingman, F/Off Khalil Ahmad also suffered a similar fate, and was captured by Indian troops. CO of 14 Squadron PAF, Wg. Cdr. MA Choudhry, who was also the formation leader was also shot down, but was fortunate enough to escape towards the Pakistani side of the Indo-East Pakistan border. Flight Lieutenant Mehdi parachuted 50 yrs. behind the Chaugachha Upazila where he was pulled by the Indian Army soldiers, and he was physically attacked by the Indian Army soldiers before being rescued by the Captain H. S. Panag, the section commander of the Indian Army. His capture as POW made him the first Pakistani POW and was eventually taken under the custody of Panag who later sent him to Fort Williams. At the time of his capture, his 9 mm pistol, survival kit, aviator glasses, and the photo of his wife was recovered by Panag.

His status as the first prisoner of war made the front pages of the Indian newspapers, and the photos of his capture were widely circulated in the black-and-white television screens of the Pakistani news media. Upon hearing and watching the news, President Yahya Khan imposed the state of emergency, and ordered the military for the preparation of war with India on 23 November 1971.

According to the East-Pakistani sources, the No. 14 Squadron Tail choppers suffered with minor casualties due to lack of effective radars that would provide them with an early warning, whereas the attacking Indian Air Force planes were directed by Indian radar controllers at Barrackpore.

Repatriation, war and command appointments in the military 

The population transfer agreement signed between the Governments of India, Pakistan, and Bangladesh made it possible for war prisoners to be transported back to Pakistan from India in 1973–75. Upon his return, Mehdi was directed to attend the war course at the Air War College where he attained master's degree in War studies in 1976. In 1977, Squadron-Leader, Mehdi served to join the faculty of the Combat Commanders School (CCS), a TOPGUN training school, which he remained associated with several years.

From 1977 to 1979, Wing-Commander Mehdi served as the commanding officer when he commanded the No. 9 Squadron Griffins, stationed in Sargodha Air Force Base. In 1981–83, Group-Captain Mehdi was appointed as the base commander of the Sargodha AFB. During this time, Mehdi qualified as a combat pilot to fly the F-16s.

In 1991–93, Air-Cdre Mehdi was appointed AOC of the Southern Air Command, based in Sindh, Pakistan, and was promoted to the two-star rank, moved to command the Northern Air Command. In 1993, AVM Mehdi took over the command of the Air Defence Command, then-based in the Chaklala AFB. In 1995, Mehdi was promoted to the three-star rank, posted at the Air Headquarters (AHQ) in Islamabad as Deputy Chief of the Air Staff (Operations). He remained in this capacity until 1997.

In 1997, Air-Marshal Mehdi was elevated and appointed as the Vice Chief of Air Staff (VCAS) under then-air chief Air Chief Marshal Abbas Khattak.

Chief of Air Staff

On 7 November 1997, Prime Minister Nawaz Sharif approved the promotion papers of Mehdi to be elevated to the four-star rank, Air Chief Marshal, and subsequently took over the command of the Pakistan Air Force as its Chief of Air Staff (CAS) on 8 November 1997. As an air chief, Mehdi played a crucial role in expanding the educational scope of the Air War College in Karachi, and backed up the military's plan for enhancing its communication capabilities between the branches of the Pakistani military.

In 1998, Mehdi backed and spoke in favor of authorizing the nuclear weapon testing during the national security meeting with the civilian cabinet. Gen. Mehdi issued directives to the F-16s belonging to the No. 11 Squadron Arrows to escort the C-130H to strategically airlift six-to-seven nuclear device in tight finger-four formation to the weapon-testing sites in Balochistan, Pakistan. Mehdi did not comment or offered any opinion when Prime Minister Sharif relieved the military commission of then-Chairman Joint chiefs General Jehangir Karamat in 1998.

Kargil conflict

Mehdi commanded the air force during the two-month long military confrontation with the Indian Army in 1999. During this conflict and meeting with the chairman joint chiefs, Mehdi advised against having the air force involved with the Indian Air Force, quoting: "(sic)...any intervention by the Pakistan Air Force into disputed land of Indian Kashmir would be perceived as an escalation to all-out declared war." Despite the strong urging of the JS HQ, the AHQ issued orders to their commanders to restrict the war efforts, knowing that "cross-border attacks either on the side of the LoC or the international border would invite an immediate response from the Indian Air Force, possibly in the shape of a retaliatory strike against the home base of the intruding fighters–thus starting the first round."

Furthermore, the aerial embargo placed by the United States in 1989–91 had badly affected the operational capabilities of the air force to carry out day-and-night combat missions. After much discussions, the F-16s were deployed but under the country's airspace and did not part in the war, although the aircraft began patrolling the Skardu air force base only to protect the base from any Indian Air Force incursion. After the aerial mission flew to support the Indian Army, the F-16s from the Northern Air Command were deployed for combat air patrol that began patrolling the Skardu Air Force Base only to protect the base from any Indian Air Force incursion.

At several meetings, Mehdi had objected Gen. Musharraf's grand strategy when he pointed out the aftermath of Chengiz Khan, a successful mission of PAF but it led the start of 1971 war which end up as a disaster for Pakistan. Therefore, Mehdi objected any direct confrontation mission but favoured the patrolling missions and remaining silent in support of other officers who gave vital criticism of Musharraf.

Retirement

In the military and political circles, Mehdi's image was widely known to have an imposing personality, and a direct but strict attitude towards his principles. His retirement was eventually confirmed when a junior-most air force general was promoted take succeed him, leading to speculations that "PQ Mehdi's rather straight-faced and forthright dealings with a somewhat junior-general Pervez Musharraf (although both graduated with same class) particularly during Kargil conflict was a good reason to believe that the general decided to appoint a not-very-senior air chief marshal whom he could order around like one of his Corps Commanders.".

Therefore, General Musharraf favoured to supersede five senior air force generals and appointed a sixth-in-line to the four-star rank once Mehdi was due for retirement.

Awards and decorations

Foreign Decorations

References

External links
PAF s' Chief of the Air Staffs
Kargil Conflict and Pakistan Air Force by Kaiser Tufail
ACM Parvaiz Mehdi assumes charge (Dawn)

 

1943 births
Phalia
Punjabi people
Pakistan Air Force Academy alumni
Pakistani aviators
Pilots of the Indo-Pakistani War of 1965
People of the Bangladesh Liberation War
Shot-down aviators
Pilots of the Indo-Pakistani War of 1971
Pakistani military personnel of the Indo-Pakistani War of 1971
Pakistani prisoners of war
People of the Kargil War
Chiefs of Air Staff, Pakistan
Living people